Jeong So-yeon (born May 5, 1994), known mononymously as Soyeon, is a South Korean singer. She debuted in 2014 as the vocalist of the South Korean girl group Laboum. In 2022, she became a member of the project supergroup WSG Wannabe.

Early life and education 
Jeong So-yeon was born in Gwangju on May 4, 1994. She attended Gwangju Cultural Middle School. In 2011, Jeong was a contestant on the South Korean television talent show series Superstar K 3, where she appeared with her school friend and fellow K-pop idol Bae Suzy.

Music career 

Jeong made her debut in August 2014 as the vocalist of the South Korean girl group Laboum. Aside from her group activities, she has participated in a number of soundtracks for South Korean television series since early in her career. She is an active songwriter and has composed songs for both Laboum and other artists, including the title track of Laboum's 2018 single album Between Us.

In 2016, Jeong was a cast member and contestant on the South Korean television singing competition Girl Spirit.

Following the resurgence of Laboum on South Korean music charts after they were featured on the reality/variety television show Hangout with Yoo, Jeong has auditioned on the show to become a member of the project supergroup WSG Wannabe. She successfully passed the audition and became a member of the Gaya-G sub-unit, which went on to claim a first place all-kill on South Korean music charts.

Discography

Singles

Soundtrack appearances

Composition credits 
All song credits are adapted from the Korea Music Copyright Association's database, unless otherwise noted.

Videography

Music videos

Filmography

Television shows

Awards and nominations

Notes

References 

1994 births
Living people
People from Gwangju
21st-century South Korean women singers
K-pop singers
South Korean women singer-songwriters
South Korean female idols